This is a list of mayors of the city of Aarau, Switzerland. The Stadtammann chairs the Stadtrat, the executive of Aarau. Since 1 January 2014, the function is called Stadtpräsident.

List of mayors:

References 

Aarau
 
Lists of mayors (complete 1900-2013)
Aarau